The following is a list of Saturn Award nominees and winners for Best Supporting Actress, which rewards the best female supporting performance in a genre film. Anne Ramsey and Tilda Swinton are the only actresses to win this award multiple times (twice), while only Whoopi Goldberg and Mercedes Ruehl have won both the Saturn Award and the Academy Award for Best Supporting Actress for the same role.

Winners and nominees

1970s

1980s

1990s

2000s

2010s

2020s

Multiple nominations
5 nominations
 Scarlett Johansson

3 nominations
 Joan Allen
 Grace Jones
 Evangeline Lilly
 Rene Russo
 Frances Sternhagen
 Charlize Theron

2 nominations
 Kirstie Alley
 Ana de Armas
 Kim Basinger
 Halle Berry
 Veronica Cartwright
 Jessica Chastain
 Joan Cusack
 Judi Dench
 Cameron Diaz
 Carrie Fisher
 Whoopi Goldberg
 Anne Hathaway
 Nicole Kidman
 Keira Knightley
 Diane Kruger
 Lucy Liu
 Helen Mirren
 Anne Ramsey
 Zelda Rubinstein
 Maggie Smith
 Sissy Spacek
 Meryl Streep
 Tilda Swinton
 Emily Watson
 Robin Wright

Multiple wins
2 wins
Anne Ramsey
 Tilda Swinton

External links
Official Site
Internet Movie Database: 3rd, 4th, 5th, 6th, 7th, 8th, 9th, 10th, 11th, 12th, 13th, 14th, 15th, 16th, 17th, 18th, 19th, 20th, 21st, 22nd, 23rd, 24th, 25th, 26th, 27th, 28th, 29th, 30th, 31st, 32nd, 33rd, 34th, 35th, 36th, 37th, 38th, 39th, 40th, 41st, 42nd, 43rd

Supporting Actress (Film)
Film awards for supporting actress